Polk State College competes in the Suncoast Conference of division I of the NJCAA Region 8 within the Florida State College Activities Association (FSCAA) and offers athletic programs in men's basketball and baseball, and women's cheerleading, soccer, softball and volleyball Their athletics teams have been known as the Eagles since 2011 after previously competing as the Vikings.
As of 2013, men's basketball has won 12 Suncoast Conference championships, three NJCAA region 8 championships.

Men's sports
 Baseball
 Basketball

Women's sports
 Cheerleading
 Soccer
 Softball
 Volleyball

References

External links 
 
 Official university website

Florida College System
Sports in Polk County, Florida